George Burbury (born 16 June 1992) is a former professional Australian rules footballer who played for the Geelong Football Club in the Australian Football League (AFL). Burbury made his debut in round 9 of the 2013 AFL season.
Burbury was delisted at the conclusion of the 2014 AFL season

References

External links

1992 births
Living people
Geelong Football Club players
Australian rules footballers from Tasmania
Hobart Football Club players
Sandringham Football Club players